Fang Zuqi (born October 1935) is a general in the People's Liberation Army of China who served as political commissar of the Nanjing Military Region from 1993 to 2000.

He was a member of the Standing Committee of the 10th Chinese People's Political Consultative Conference. He was a member of the 15th Central Committee of the Chinese Communist Party.

Biography
Fang was born in Jingjiang, Jiangsu, in October 1935, while his ancestral home in Huizhou, Anhui.

He enlisted in the People's Liberation Army (PLA) in August 1951, and joined the Chinese Communist Party (CCP) in June 1956. He participated in the Korean War in June 1952. He was assigned to the Shenyang Military Region in May 1970, what he eventually served as deputy director in December 1984. He became a member of the Standing Committee of the CPC Guangzhou Military Regional Committee and director of Political Department in April 1990 before being assigned to the similar position in the Beijing Military Region in November 1992. He rose to become political commissar of the Nanjing Military Region in December 1993. In March 2003, he was chosen as vice chairperson of the Education, Science, Health and Sports Committee of the Chinese People's Political Consultative Conference.

He was promoted to the rank of major general (shaojiang) in September 1988, lieutenant general (zhongjiang) in July 1993, and general (shangjiang) in March 1998.

References

1935 births
Living people
People from Jingjiang
People's Liberation Army generals from Jiangsu
People's Republic of China politicians from Jiangsu
Chinese Communist Party politicians from Jiangsu
Members of the 15th Central Committee of the Chinese Communist Party
Members of the Standing Committee of the 10th Chinese People's Political Consultative Conference
Political commissars of the Nanjing Military Region